Armand-François Marie Cillart de Suville (Séglien, 1 February 1730 — Jersey, 30 June 1801) was a French Navy officer. He served in the War of American Independence.

Biography 
Cillart was born in an aristocratic family. His father was captain in a dragoon unit, and two of his brothers, Étienne-François de Cillart de Villeneuve and Jean-Marie de Villeneuve Cillart, also served in the Navy.

Cillart joined the Navy as a Garde-Marine in 1746. During the Seven Years' War, he served on the 74-gun Robuste in 1759. He took part in the expedition to Newfoundland under Ternay on the frigate Licorne.

He was promoted to Lieutenant in 1771, and to Captain in 1777. In 1779, he was given command of the 64-gun Réfléchi, part of the White squadron (centre) of the fleet under Orvilliers.  He was wounded at the Battle of Grenada on 6 July 1779, and took part in the Battle of Martinique on 18 December 1779 under Lamotte-Picquet.

He later took part in the Battle of the Chesapeake on 5 September 1781.

In 1782, he was promoted to Brigadier. On 20 October, he commanded the 74-gun Actif at the Battle of Cape Spartel, under Admiral Córdova.

In 1786, he was promoted to Chef d'Escadre.

On 1 January 1792, he was promoted to contre-amiral.

Sources and references 
 Notes

Citations

Bibliography
 
 
 

French Navy officers
French military personnel of the American Revolutionary War
1730 births
1801 deaths